Eyne Acevedo Tabares (born 6 February 1970) is a Colombian weightlifter. He competed in the 1992 Summer Olympics.

References

1970 births
Living people
Weightlifters at the 1992 Summer Olympics
Colombian male weightlifters
Olympic weightlifters of Colombia
Pan American Games medalists in weightlifting
Pan American Games silver medalists for Colombia
Central American and Caribbean Games medalists in weightlifting
Weightlifters at the 1991 Pan American Games
Weightlifters at the 1995 Pan American Games
20th-century Colombian people
21st-century Colombian people